The USS Bennington Monument is a  granite obelisk in the Fort Rosecrans National Cemetery, Point Loma, San Diego, California, United States. The explosion showered the vessel with live steam and scalding water, killing 66 men (1 officer and 65 other sailors) and burning an additional 46. It was the worst peacetime disaster for the U.S. Navy up to that time.

The dead were buried at Fort Rosecrans; some were later disinterred and shipped home for burial by their families. The monument at the site of the graves was dedicated three years later, on 7 January 1908.

See also
 Other US Navy Memorials

References

External links
 

Monuments and memorials in California
United States Navy
Obelisks in the United States
Buildings and structures in San Diego
Buildings and structures completed in 1908
1908 sculptures
Granite sculptures in California
1908 establishments in California